Juan Carlos Viera Rossano (1938-2016) was a Seventh-day Adventist and was director of the Ellen G. White Estate from 1995 to 2000. A native of Uruguay, Viera was the first director of the White Estate to come from outside the North American Division. He holds an M.A. in Religion from Andrews University (1976) and a doctorate in Missiology from Fuller Theological Seminary. In 1998 he wrote the book "The Voice of the Spirit: How God Has Led His People Through the Gift of Prophecy" (Pacific Press, 1998; available online).

See also

 Seventh-day Adventist Church
 Seventh-day Adventist theology
 Seventh-day Adventist eschatology
 History of the Seventh-day Adventist Church
 Inspiration of Ellen G. White
 Ellen G. White Estate

External links 
 The Voice of the Spirit hosted online at the Ellen G. White Estate website

1938 births
Living people
Ellen G. White Estate
Seventh-day Adventist religious workers
Seventh-day Adventist administrators
American Seventh-day Adventists
History of the Seventh-day Adventist Church
Uruguayan Seventh-day Adventists
Andrews University alumni